God Speed is a painting by British artist Edmund Leighton, depicting an armored knight departing to war and leaving his beloved. The painting was exhibited in the Royal Academy of Arts in 1900. God Speed was the first of several paintings by Leighton in the 1900s on the subject of chivalry, including The Accolade (1901) and The Dedication (1908).

Composition
A woman ties a red sash around a knight's arm.

When the painting was ready for transportation to the Royal Academy, Leighton made a last-moment change in the studio. He scraped out the work of a week and within two hours made his desired change.

Provenance
After being bought from Leighton, the painting was owned by several people and in 1988 appeared at Christie's. It was then housed in an American private collection and in 2000 was again submitted to Christie's. In 2007 the painting appeared at Sotheby's and then in a British private collection. On 10 May 2012 God Speed was sold again for £481,250 to a private collector through Sotheby's in London.

References

1900 paintings
History paintings
Paintings by Edmund Leighton
Women in art
War paintings
Horses in art